Yemenia Flight 448 was a domestic scheduled passenger flight piloted by Captain Amer Anis from Sana'a to al-Hudaydah, Yemen, that was hijacked on 23 January 2001. The Yemenia Yemen Airways Boeing 727-2N8 departed Sana'a International Airport bound for a stopover at Taiz-Al Janad Airport, Ta'izz. The passengers included the United States Ambassador to Yemen Barbara Bodine, US Deputy Chief of Mission to Yemen, and the Yemeni Ambassador to the US.

Fifteen minutes after takeoff, a man armed with a pen gun hijacked the aircraft and demanded to be taken to Baghdad, Iraq. In addition to his gun, he claimed to have explosives hidden in his suitcase. The flight crew convinced the hijacker to first divert to Djibouti to refuel.

The aircraft made an emergency landing at Djibouti–Ambouli International Airport, where the flight crew, Led by flight captain Amer Anis, then overpowered the hijacker in what US State Department Richard Boucher described the act as "really terrific action". The only injury was to the flight engineer, who was grazed by a bullet during the fight.

The hijacker was an unemployed Iraqi who wanted to look elsewhere for employment opportunities. He was extradited to Yemen, and sentenced to 15 years in prison in March 2001.

References 

Aviation accidents and incidents in 2001
Accidents and incidents involving the Boeing 727
Aviation accidents and incidents in Djibouti
Aircraft hijackings
Terrorist incidents in Yemen in 2001
United States–Yemen relations
Djibouti–Yemen relations
Terrorist incidents in Djibouti
2001 in Djibouti
21st century in Djibouti (city)
January 2001 events in Africa
Yemenia accidents and incidents